The 1986 Monaco Grand Prix was a Formula One motor race held at Monaco on 11 May 1986. It was the fourth race of the 1986 Formula One World Championship. The Monaco circuit had been modified from the year before: the chicane after the tunnel now had three turns and was renamed the Nouvelle Chicane. 

Patrick Tambay had a spectacular accident when he and Martin Brundle tangled at Mirabeau, and Tambay's Lola went right over Brundle's Tyrrell, caught six feet of air and barrel-rolled into the protective Armco right next to some spectators, and in the process almost went over the Armco into a bar next to the track. Tambay walked away from the accident unscathed.

The 78-lap race was won from pole position by Frenchman Alain Prost, driving a McLaren-TAG. This was Prost's third consecutive Monaco win. His Finnish teammate Keke Rosberg finished second, with Brazilian Ayrton Senna third in a Lotus-Renault.

This was also the last Grand Prix for Italian Elio de Angelis, before his fatal testing accident at Paul Ricard three days later.

Classification

Qualifying

Race

Championship standings after the race

Drivers' Championship standings

Constructors' Championship standings

References

Monaco Grand Prix
Monaco Grand Prix
Grand Prix